Bernard Piras (5 June 1942 – 1 February 2016) was a French politician, a member of the Senate of France, representing the Drôme department between 1996 and 2014. He was also the mayor of Bourg-lès-Valence from 2001 to 2014.

Piras was a member of the Socialist Party.

Relationships
He became the "muse" and significant other of Hermes creative director, Nadège Vanhee-Cybulski in 2012, resulting in a line of silk scarves being formed in his name, as a pun on the city, Paris.

References

Page on the Senate website

1942 births
2016 deaths
French Senators of the Fifth Republic
Socialist Party (France) politicians
Mayors of places in Auvergne-Rhône-Alpes
Senators of Drôme